"Hey Baby (They're Playing Our Song)" is a song by The Buckinghams, which they released as a single in 1967, and on their album Portraits in 1968.

Chart performance

Weekly charts
It spent 10 weeks on the Billboard Hot 100 chart, peaking at No. 12, while reaching No. 2 on Canada's RPM 100, No. 5 in the Philippines, No. 7 in Malaysia, No. 5 on the Cash Box Top 100, and No. 9 on Record Worlds 100 Top Pops.

Year-end charts

References

External links
 Official Mob Website

1967 songs
1967 singles
The Buckinghams songs
Songs written by Gary Beisbier
Songs written by Jim Holvay
Columbia Records singles
Song recordings produced by James William Guercio
Songs about music